Knotting is a village and former civil parish, now in the parish of Knotting and Souldrop, in the Bedford district, in the ceremonial county of Bedfordshire, located near the border with Northamptonshire. Nearby places are, Sharnbrook, Podington, Odell, Melchbourne, Yelden, Newton Bromswold, Souldrop and Rushden over the border in Northamptonshire. In 1931 the parish had a population of 114. On 1 April 1934 the parish was abolished to form "Knotting and Souldrop".

Parish church

The Parish Church is partly of 12th century Norman construction, including a chancel arch with carved decoration, and is dedicated to St Margaret. The registers date from 1592 and many of these are deposited at the Bedfordshire and Luton Archives and Records Service. The church was vested with the Churches Conservation Trust on 1 April 2009.

References

External links

 
 St. Margaret's Church

Villages in Bedfordshire
Former civil parishes in Bedfordshire
Borough of Bedford